"The Gift" is a song written by Nancy Montgomery, and recorded by American country music trio The McCarters. It was released in May 1988 as the second single and title track from their album The Gift. The song peaked at number 4 on the Billboard Hot Country Singles chart.

Charts

Weekly charts

Year-end charts

References

1988 singles
The McCarters songs
Warner Records singles
Song recordings produced by Paul Worley
1988 songs